Roger Leo Bernashe (1927-2014) was an American politician who served in the Massachusetts House of Representatives from 1959 to 1971 and the Massachusetts Senate from 1971 to 1979. Outside politics he worked in insurance and real estate.

See also
Obituary

References

1927 births
Democratic Party Massachusetts state senators
Democratic Party members of the Massachusetts House of Representatives
People from Chicopee, Massachusetts
University of Massachusetts Amherst alumni
2014 deaths